Thiruvallur Lok Sabha constituency is a newly formed Lok Sabha (Parliament of India) constituency after the 2008 delimitation. Its Tamil Nadu Parliamentary Constituency number is 1 of 39. It was formed after merging the assembly segments of Gummidipoondi, Ponneri (SC), Tiruvallur, and Poonamallee (SC), which were earlier parts of Sriperumbudur constituency and the newly formed Avadi. 

The constituency had previously existed for three elections from 1951 till 1962.

It is reserved for Scheduled Castes (SC).

Assembly segments

Members of the Parliament

Election results

General Elections 2019

General Elections 2014

General Elections 2009

References

External links
Thiruvallur lok sabha  constituency election 2019 date and schedule

Lok Sabha constituencies in Tamil Nadu
Tiruvallur district